Ryan Alexander Hawley (born 21 September 1985) is an English actor, known for his portrayal of Robert Sugden in the ITV soap opera Emmerdale from 2014 to 2019.

Early life 
Hawley, son of Christine and Steve, spent his childhood partly in Sheffield and partly in the UAE due to his parents' work, making him a Third Culture Kid.

In school, Hawley took A-Level Media Studies and took part in numerous school plays, subsequently realising his dream of becoming a film director was very difficult. Hawley went to university and trained to become an actor at The Royal Central School of Speech and Drama in London, England.

Career 
Hawley's acting career began in 2007, when he began to appear in a number of television series, films and stage productions. He made his television debut in the pilot of American series Life Is Wild as Tim. In 2013, he appeared in Devil's Pass, a Russian-British horror film, as Andy Thatcher.

In 2014, Hawley was cast in his most prominent role as Robert Sugden on the ITV soap opera Emmerdale, becoming the fourth actor to portray the character.

He has received critical acclaim for his portrayal and has been nominated for several awards, including "Best Villain" and "Best Actor" at The British Soap Awards.

In June 2019, it was announced that Hawley would be leaving Emmerdale after five years. His exit aired on 1 November of that year.

Personal life
In 2013, Hawley married Daisy Prestes de Oliveira. Together they have a son, born in 2021.

Filmography

Awards and nominations

References

External links

Living people
Alumni of the Royal Central School of Speech and Drama
People from Dubai
Male actors from Sheffield
1985 births